K192 or K-192 may refer to:

K-192 (Kansas highway), state highway in Kansas
Mass in F major, K. 192
HMS Bryony (K192), former UK Royal Navy ship
Haultain Lake 192K, Indian reserve